Wang Yi (born August 18, 1992) is a Chinese figure skater coach, former figure skater and an ice dancer starting from 2021. He has competed at three Four Continents Championships, reaching the top ten in 2015.

Programs

Competitive highlights

As a ice dance team with Xiao Zixi

GP: Grand Prix

As a men's single skater
GP: Grand Prix

References

External links 
 

1992 births
Chinese male single skaters
Living people
People from Liaoyuan
Figure skaters from Jilin
Competitors at the 2013 Winter Universiade